Tannishtha Chatterjee is an Indian actress and director best known in the west for her performance in the British film Brick Lane (2007), the film adaptation of Monica Ali's best selling novel of the same name for which she was nominated best actress at the British Independent Film Awards. Her other notable roles have been in Academy Award-winning German director Florian Gallenberger's film Shadows of Time, Road, Movie with Abhay Deol,  Dekh Indian Circus, for which she won the National Film Award – Special Jury Award / Special Mention (Feature Film) and Marathi film Doctor Rakhmabai for which she has won the Best Actress Award at RIFF (Rajasthan International Film Festival) and PIFF (Pune International Film Festival). In 2019 she directed her first feature film Roam Rome Mein.

Early life
Chatterjee was born in Pune, Maharashtra, to a Bengali Hindu family. Her father was a business executive and her mother was a political science professor. Her family traveled and lived out of the country for some time, then moved to Delhi. She majored in Chemistry at Delhi University before entering the National School of Drama.

Career
Chatterjee's performance in the German film Shadows of Time earned her critical acclaim. It took her to international film festivals, including the Toronto International Film Festival and the Berlin International Film Festival. Thereafter she worked on an Indo-French coproduction Hava Aney Dey (Let the Wind Blow) directed by Partho Sen-Gupta which premiered at the Berlin International Film Festival and won the best film award at the Durban International Film Festival among others. Following these, Chatterjee acted in Strings, Kasturi and the Bengali film Bibar, winning critical acclaim and best actress awards. Her work in the British film Brick Lane directed by Sarah Gavron gave her international exposure and recognition. Chatterjee was nominated for the British independent film awards along with actresses Judi Dench and Anne Hathaway.

Chatterjee played a major role in Bhopal: Prayer for Rain in which she starred with Martin Sheen. She was the lead in Road, Movie with Abhay Deol and as earned the moniker Princess of Parallel Cinema in the Indian press. Chatterjee was referred by the Indian media as the chief flag bearer at the 62nd Cannes Film Festival. She won the best actress award at the Miaac New York Film Festival for her film Bombay Summer. Referred to as one of the most international of Indian actors, she is the lead in Lucy Liu's film Meena based on the book Half the Sky.

A trained Hindustani classical vocalist, she sang in the movies Road, Page 3, among others. She sang at the Royal Opera House in London with British composer Jocelyn Pook.

Chatterjee was a member of the jury at the 2010 Asia Pacific Screen Awards. She appeared in a T series film I Love New Year opposite Sunny Deol directed by Radhika Rao and Vinay Sapru.

Tannishtha's Canadian film Siddharth was in official selection at the 70th Venice Film Festival and the 2013 Toronto International Film Festival. She is the only Indian actress whose films have been selected in three of the major international film festivals in the same year.
Her other notable projects are Parched directed by Leena Yadav which opened in Toronto, Australian romantic comedy Unindian with Brett Lee Island City which won the best debut director( Ruchika Oberoi) in Venice and Garth Davies's film LION co-starring Nicole Kidman and Dev Patel. Her film Angry Indian Goddesses received acclaim in Toronto and Rome international film festivals. In March 2016 Tannishtha was given a special award in a ceremony held at the BAFTA for her contribution to Asian Cinema. She won the best actress for the film Parched along with three other actresses in Festival 2 Valenciennes and the Indian Film Festival of Los Angeles 2016. She was the president of the jury of the MOOOV film festival in Belgium in 2016.
She won the best actress at the Pune International Film Festival 2017 for her role in Dr. Rakhmabai.
In 2019 Tannishtha made her directorial Debut Roam Rome Mein which had its World premier at Busan International Film Festival where she won the Asia Star Award.

Activism
Tannishtha speaks quite often on the issue of race/colorism in Indian media. She has walked out during a roast when her skin color was the subject of jokes. She explored racism in Indian film and TV industry on Mithaq Kazimi's talk show series. Personally, she adopted a baby girl and has encouraged others to do the same.

Filmography

Films

Web series

Awards

References

External links

Living people
Actresses in Hindi cinema
Indian film actresses
21st-century Indian actresses
Actresses from Delhi
National School of Drama alumni
Delhi University alumni
1980 births
Indian women classical singers
Singers from Maharashtra
Musicians from Pune
Bengali actresses
Singers from Delhi
Actresses from Pune
Indian women playback singers
21st-century Indian women singers
21st-century Indian singers
Women musicians from Maharashtra
Special Mention (feature film) National Film Award winners